Wellington College International Shanghai is a co-educational day and boarding school with over 1,100 pupils, aged 3 to 18 years old.
Wellington shares its not-for-profit status and royal foundation with its sister school, Wellington College in the UK, which was originally founded by Queen, Victoria in 1859 as the national memorial to Arthur Wellesley, the 1st Duke of Wellington.

Leadership

The Master of Wellington College International Shanghai is Gerard MacMahon.

As of August 2017, Gerard MacMahon is the Executive Master for all Wellingtons schools in Shanghai (as of August 2018, this will include Wellington College Bilingual Shanghai). Eleanor Prescott is the Principal of the international school.

Curriculum

Wellington pupils follow a mixture of the British National Curriculum and the International Primary Curriculum from Pre-Nursery until Year 9, which leads to the International General Certificate of Secondary Education IGCSE in Years 10–11. In Years 12 and 13, the pupils study for the highly recognised International Baccalaureate Diploma Programme (IBDP).

Sport

Throughout the academic year, pupils are able to experience all major sport, including football, cricket, rugby, netball, swimming, athletics, and racket sports such as tennis and badminton. In addition to these, more sports are offered within the co-curricular activities including scuba diving and martial arts.

Pupils have the opportunity to compete at home and abroad. The college is invited or hosts a range of sporting competitions through our membership in leagues including the Federation of British International Schools in Asia (FOBISIA) and Association of China and Mongolia International Schools (ACAMIS).

The college is home to a sports hall, three football pitches, a 400-meter all-weather synthetic running track, tennis and basketball courts, and two swimming pools, including a 25 metres, six-lane competition pool, amongst multiple other indoor and outdoor facilities.

Activities

Various co-curricular activities run from Monday to Thursday as an integral and compulsory part of the school day from Year 3 onwards. Annual events like Summer Festival and Arts Festival also provide opportunities for pupils to perform and showcase their learning and talent across drama, dance, music, creative writing, art and design.

See also
 Wellington College International Tianjin - Another Wellington College campus in Tianjin, China

References

External links
 Wellington College International Shanghai

Schools in Pudong
British international schools in Shanghai
International Baccalaureate schools in China